Brendon Small's Galaktikon II: Become the Storm is the second solo album by Brendon Small, known for his work on the animated television shows Metalocalypse and Home Movies, and as creator of virtual death metal band Dethklok. The album was released on August 25, 2017 through Megaforce Records. The album features Dethklok members Gene Hoglan and Bryan Beller, on drums and bass, respectively. Since Brendon Small no longer holds the rights to the Dethklok name, Gene Hoglan has suggested that this album would serve as a "new Dethklok album".

Production
In May 2016 it was revealed that the follow-up to Brendon Small's 2012 solo album was in production. As of December 2016, the album had been recorded and was being mixed.

Concept
When describing his influences for the album, Small stated he wanted to draw upon themes by prominent science fiction authors.

Small also added:

Release and background
The album was released on August 25, 2017 through Megaforce Records.

The musicians on this album are the same as the members of Dethklok. Brendon Small had stated that Adult Swim has restricted his ability to use the Dethklok name in his music endeavors. Gene Hoglan said in an interview that, "It’s a Dethklok album, it just can’t be called Dethklok 'cause of rights. I will say this if you love Dethklok, you will love this record. The lyrics, the music and everything is Dethklok styled".

Track listing

Vinyl release
The vinyl version features the same tracks in a different order. Brendon Small said:

Personnel
Brendon Small – vocals, guitar, keyboards, producer
Bryan Beller – bass
Gene Hoglan – drums

Production
Ulrich Wild – production, engineering, mixing
Dave Collins – mastering
Antonio Canobbio – album cover art
Michael Mesker – package design
Jeff Small – Triton helmet
Eric Powell – additional artwork
Steve Mannion – additional artwork
Steve Agee - helmet photography

References

External links

2017 albums
Galaktikon 2: Become the Storm
Megaforce Records albums
Albums produced by Ulrich Wild